Elections to the Puducherry Legislative Assembly were held in April 1996, to elect members of the 30 constituencies in Puducherry (then known as Pondicherry), in India. The Indian National Congress won the most seats, but the Dravida Munnetra Kazhagam won the popular vote, and R. V. Janakiraman was appointed as the Chief Minister of Puducherry.

Results

Elected members

See also
List of constituencies of the Puducherry Legislative Assembly
1996 elections in India

References

External links
  

1996 State Assembly elections in India
State Assembly elections in Puducherry
1990s in Pondicherry